Don't Smoke in Bed is an album by the Holly Cole Trio that draws its title from a composition by Willard Robison. Originally released in Canada in 1993 on Alert Records, the album was also released internationally in 1993 on the Manhattan imprint of Capitol Records.

Track listing
 "I Can See Clearly Now" (Johnny Nash) – 4:13
 "Don't Let the Teardrops Rust Your Shining Heart" (Ben Watt) – 4:20
 "Get Out of Town" (Cole Porter) – 4:43
 "So and So" (O'Hara) – 3:27
 "The Tennessee Waltz" (Pee Wee King, Redd Stewart) – 3:40
 "Everyday Will Be Like a Holiday" (William Bell, Booker T. Jones) – 4:49
 "Blame It on My Youth" (Edward Heyman, Oscar Levant) – 3:00
 "Ev'rything I've Got" (Lorenz Hart, Richard Rodgers) – 2:55
 "Je ne t'aime pas" (Kurt Weill, Maurice Magre) – 3:57
 "Cry (If You Want To)" (Scott) – 2:37
 "Que sera sera" (Ray Evans, Jay Livingston) – 4:44
 "Don't Smoke in Bed" (Willard Robison) – 2:27

Personnel

 Holly Cole – vocals
 Aaron Davis – piano 
 David Piltch – bass 
 Howard Levy – harmonica 
 Joe Henderson – tenor saxophone (some spots on "Everyday Will Be Like a Holiday")
 David Was – producer

References

Holly Cole albums
1993 albums
Capitol Records albums
Albums produced by David Was
Juno Award for Contemporary Jazz Album of the Year albums